Twilight is the sixth album released by The Handsome Family. It was released 2001 by Carrot Top Records (North America) / Loose Music (Europe).

Track listing
 "The Snow White Diner" – 4:01
 "Passenger Pigeons" – 4:29
 "A Dark Eye" – 3:53
 "There Is A Sound" – 3:26
 "All The TVs In Town" – 3:05
 "Gravity" – 3:08
 "Cold, Cold, Cold" – 3:10
 "No One Fell Asleep Alone" – 2:48
 "I Know You Are There" – 3:40
 "Birds You Cannot See" - 2:53
 "The White Dog" - 3:36
 "So Long" - 3:31
 "Peace In The Valley Once Again" - 3:03

Personnel
 The Handsome Family
Brett Sparks - wrote and played all music except as follows
 Rennie Sparks - all lyrics, all female vocals, autoharp

References

External links
The Handsome Family official website

2001 albums
The Handsome Family albums
Carrot Top Records albums
Loose Music albums